The Jarvis is a historic apartment building at 27 Everett Street, on the north side of the Harvard University campus in Cambridge, Massachusetts.  Built in 1890, the -story brick building was one of the first apartment houses built in the vicinity of northern Massachusetts Avenue.  At the time, Massachusetts Avenue north of Harvard was predominantly lined with large fashionable houses.  The Jarvis fit into this to some extent by being designed to resemble a large single family residence of the time.  The building has irregular Queen Anne massing, polychrome trim, and massive corbelled end chimneys.

The building was listed on the National Register of Historic Places in 1986.

See also
National Register of Historic Places listings in Cambridge, Massachusetts

References

Apartment buildings on the National Register of Historic Places in Massachusetts
Buildings and structures in Cambridge, Massachusetts
Houses completed in 1890
National Register of Historic Places in Cambridge, Massachusetts